Inka Qhamachu (Quechua Inka Inca, qhamachu a species of wild tobacco (Nicotiana glauca), Hispanicized names Inca Camacho, Incacamachi) is a  mountain in the Andes of Bolivia. It is located in the Oruro Department, Litoral Province, Huachacalla Municipality. Inka Qhamachu lies southeast of Pacha Qullu, southeast of the village of Huachacalla (Wachaqalla).

The Altiplano has been affected by volcanic activity. Most of it including Inka Qhamachu is extinct, but in the Western Cordillera volcanic activity persists at Cerro Quemado, Guallatiri, Parinacota, Sajama and Tata Sabaya.

Its slopes range 11–16°, formed by lava flows and pyroclastic material. Erosion has carved radial gullies into its flanks, at whose ends alluvial fans have formed. Based on the degree of erosion, an age of 7.5 million years has been estimated.

The area is very windy. This climate has led to a xerophytic vegetation, including shrubs and tussock grass.

References 

Mountains of Oruro Department
Four-thousanders of the Andes